Fine dining is a restaurant experience that is typically more sophisticated, unique, and expensive than at an average restaurant. The décor of such restaurants features higher-quality materials, with establishments having certain rules of dining which visitors are generally expected to follow, sometimes including a dress code.  

Fine dining establishments are sometimes called white-tablecloth restaurants, because they traditionally featured table service by servers, at tables covered by white tablecloths. The tablecloths came to symbolize the experience. The use of white tablecloths eventually became less fashionable, but the service and upscale ambiance remained.

History
The precursor to fine dining started around the 1780s when health-conscious bouillon shops evolved into grand "Parisian restaurants like Trois Frères and La Grande Tavene de Londres". In France, César Ritz, a Swiss developer, partnered with prominent French chef Auguste Escoffier at the Grand Hotel of Monte Carlo. This became the first restaurant to offer "luxury accommodations and gourmet dining all under one roof". In France, fine dining became yet another way of aping the aristocracy.

Other luxury hotels soon developed across Europe.

The first fine dining restaurants in the United States operated in New York City, such as Delmonico's in the 19th century. The restaurant contained a 1,000-bottle wine cellar and remains in the same location.

See also
 Types of restaurants

References

 
Restaurants by type